The Master of Nonprofit Organizations (MNO or MNPO), Master of Non-profit Management (MNM), Master of Not-for-Profit Leadership (MNPL), Master of Nonprofit Studies (MNpS), Master of Public Affairs (MPA), Master of Philanthropic Studies, Master of Nonprofit Administration (MNA), Master of Public Administration in Nonprofit Management (MPA), Master of Business Administration in Nonprofit Management (MBA), and similarly named degrees offer graduate-level training in management and leadership in the nonprofit sector.

As evidenced by the lack of a uniform name, degrees in nonprofit management are a relatively new phenomenon. While some universities have established centers for nonprofit studies, such as the Mandel Center for Nonprofit Organizations at Case Western Reserve University, the Institute for Nonprofit Organizations at the University of Georgia, the Center on Philanthropy at Indiana University, and the ASU Lodestar Center for Philanthropy and Nonprofit Innovation at Arizona State University, most nonprofit management programs are within schools of social work, public administration, or management. However, as the field has grown, there are increasing numbers of free-standing graduate and undergraduate programs not bound within traditional disciplines. The Nonprofit Academic Centers Council (NACC) has developed curricular guidelines for degree programs in the nonprofit and philanthropic studies field that has helped to guide many universities in the development of their degree and certificate programs. In 1983, the School of Management at the University of San Francisco was the first institution in the nation to offer the Master of Nonprofit Administration (MNA) program.

Curriculum
A typical nonprofit Master's program would require coursework in most or all of the following subjects:
 Strategic Planning, Organizational Development, and/or Nonprofit Finance
 Fundraising
 Ethics
 Program Evaluation
 Human Resource Development and/or Volunteer Management
 Nonprofit Law

Program structures include traditional resident graduate programs, part-time programs for working professionals, and correspondence or online programs. In addition, many universities offering master's degrees also offer graduate certificates for students pursuing a graduate degree in another discipline.

USA institutions offering master's degrees in nonprofit organizations
All Hallows College
American International College
American Jewish University
Arizona State University
Bay Path University
Capella University
Case Western Reserve University
Cleveland State University
DePaul University
Eastern University
Florida Atlantic University
Hamline University
Heidelberg University
Indiana University
John Carroll University
La Salle University
Louisiana State University in Shreveport
Metropolitan State University
The New School
New York University Wagner Graduate School for Public Service
North Park University
Northeastern University
Notre Dame of Maryland University
Oklahoma City University
Oral Roberts University Graduate School of Business
Regis University
Saint Mary's University of Minnesota
Seattle University
Universidad del Sagrado Corazón
University of Central Florida
University of Delaware
University of Georgia
University of Houston–Downtown
University of Northern Iowa
University of Notre Dame
University of San Diego
University of San Francisco
University of Southern California
University of Oregon
University of Wisconsin–Milwaukee
 Washington University in St Louis
Worcester State College

USA institutions offering online master's degrees in nonprofit organizations
Adler University
Bay Path University
Capella University
La Salle University
Lasell College
Louisiana State University in Shreveport
Marylhurst University
North Park University
Our Lady of the Lake University
Regis University
Southern New Hampshire University
University of Central Florida
University of Houston–Downtown
University of Northern Iowa
University of the Rockies
University of Southern California
Upper Iowa University
Walden University

References

Master's degrees
Non-profit organizations based in the United States